Romeo James Beckham (born 1 September 2002) is an English professional footballer who plays as a forward for Brentford B, on loan from Inter Miami II.

Early and personal life
Beckham was born in Portland Hospital in the City of Westminster, London. He is the son of the former England international captain David Beckham and the singer-turned-fashion designer Victoria Beckham. His brothers Brooklyn Beckham and Cruz Beckham also played football with him for Arsenal, however both were released from the club's youth system. He remains an Arsenal supporter. He attended Wetherby School in London and then Millfield School in Street, Somerset.

In 2014, Beckham joined Arsenal's Academy but was released the following year. After his release, he admitted that he no longer wished to pursue a career in football, instead taking up tennis training with Andy Murray. In 2020, however, Beckham announced that he was looking to return to football after a five-year absence. In support of the decision, his father replaced the tennis court he had previously had built at the family home with a football pitch.

Club career
In September 2021, after turning 19, Beckham joined USL League One club Fort Lauderdale CF (renamed Inter Miami II in 2022), the reserve affiliate of his father's Major League Soccer club Inter Miami. This came after he had been seen training with the Inter Miami team in February. On 19 September, Beckham made his professional debut in a 2–2 draw against Tormenta FC. In that match, he appeared alongside Harvey Neville, the son of his father's former Manchester United teammate Phil Neville. On 26 January 2022, Beckham made his non-competitive senior debut for Inter Miami during a 4–0 pre-season win against Club Universitario de Deportes.

In October 2022, Beckham began training in England with Brentford B, who he joined in January 2023 on a six-month loan. He made his debut four days later, coming on as a second-half sub in a London Senior Cup game against Erith & Belvedere at Park View Road. He scored his first goal on 14 February 2023 in a Middlesex Senior Cup game against Wealdstone, scoring a 93rd minute winning goal in a 3-2 victory.

Career statistics

References

2002 births
Living people
Footballers from Greater London
English footballers
Association football forwards
Arsenal F.C. players
Inter Miami CF II players
USL League One players
English people of Jewish descent
English people of German descent
English expatriate footballers
Expatriate soccer players in the United States
People educated at Millfield
People educated at Wetherby School
English expatriate sportspeople in the United States
David Beckham
Victoria Beckham
MLS Next Pro players
Brentford F.C. players